The PJs: Music from & Inspired by the Hit Television Series is the soundtrack to the animated sitcom The PJs issued in March 1999 by Hollywood Records. The soundtrack rose to No. 25 on the Billboard Top R&B/Hip-Hop Albums chart.

Critical reception

With a B grade Ken Tucker of Entertainment Weekly commented "There’s also uneven filler, but for a TV soundtrack, this is tough stuff."
Heather Phares of Allmusic gave a 3 out of 5 stars rating saying "The PJs' soundtrack captures the energy and creativity of today's urban music."

Track listing

Charts

References

1999 albums
Hollywood Records soundtracks
Albums produced by Jermaine Dupri
Albums produced by Jerry Duplessis
Albums produced by Maurice White
Albums produced by No I.D.
Albums produced by Organized Noize
Albums produced by Q-Tip (musician)
Albums produced by Quincy Jones III
Albums produced by Raphael Saadiq
Albums produced by Rockwilder
Albums produced by Timbaland
Albums produced by Wyclef Jean